John Henry Marshall (born November 5, 1963) is a former middle-distance track athlete who specialized in the 800 meters. He competed for the United States at the 1984 Summer Olympics. He was married to former 800-meter runner Debbie Grant, with whom he has a son, Myles Marshall, who is also an 800-meter runner and competed for the US junior team in 2014.

Running career

High school
Marshall attended and ran with Plainfield High School in his hometown of Plainfield, New Jersey, where he graduated in 1981. He set the New Jersey High School state record in the boy's 800 meters at 1:49.5 in 1981. He also was a member of Plainfield's 4x400-meter relay team at the 1981 Penn Relays, where he ran his 400-meter split in 46.7 seconds.

Collegiate
Marshall attended and ran with Villanova University until he graduated in 1985. His collegiate highlights include winning the men's 880-yard race at the 1983 NCAA DI Indoor T&F Championships. While in school, Marshall competed at the 1984 Summer Olympics, where he ran the men's 800 meters.

References

American male middle-distance runners
1963 births
Living people
Athletes (track and field) at the 1984 Summer Olympics
Olympic track and field athletes of the United States
Plainfield High School (New Jersey) alumni
Sportspeople from Plainfield, New Jersey
Track and field athletes from New Jersey
Universiade medalists in athletics (track and field)
Universiade bronze medalists for the United States